(born 1980) is a Japanese writer and director of animated short films. Many of his works such as Pale Cocoon and Time of Eve have garnered awards and featured at film festivals. His production studio is called Studio Rikka.

Biography
Yoshiura was born in Hokkaido and was raised in Fukuoka. He majored in art engineering at Kyushu University.  In 2002, he released a short film called Aquatic Language which was broadcast on NHK BS1's 10 min. theater.  The film won an "Excellent Work Award" at the Tokyo International Anime Fair. In 2006, he released the direct-to-video film Pale Cocoon. After moving to Tokyo he worked on the anime web series Time of Eve which aired six episodes and later was made into a feature movie. In 2013 he released the film Patema Inverted, which won awards at Edinburgh's Scotland Loves Animation festival, and the Chicago International Film Festival. In 2014, he directed the film Harmonie, which was used for the Anime Mirai 2014 program. In 2015, his short PP33 (Power Plant No. 33) and Bureau of Proto Society were featured in the Japan Animator Expo.

Works

References

External links
  

1980 births
Japanese animators
Japanese animated film directors
Anime directors
Living people
Kyushu University alumni